One Perfect Day is an Australian film released in 2004.

Plot
The central character of the film is Tommy Matisse; his name combines the title of The Who's 1969 rock opera Tommy and the last name of twentieth century French painter Henri Matisse.

Tommy is a Melbourne boy studying at the Royal Academy of Music in London. He is a violinist and composer who hears music in unusual sources such as the ambient noises of a train in the London Underground or the chirping of crickets. He is a rebel against the traditions of classical music and displays this by bringing a homeless woman living in the Underground on stage for a concert.

A sympathetic professor decides that he is the type of innovative artist needed to revive a dying opera artform. Having shocked opera's establishment, he returns home to Melbourne on the death of his younger sister Emma, who suffers a fatal overdose after experimenting with drugs at a rave dance party. He discovers a CD of her own mixes and decides to enter the genre of electronic music to follow the path she was pursuing in the hopes of discovering more about his sister and how she became involved in this dance world.
Emma's death acts as a catalyst that drives Tommy and his girlfriend Alysse apart. In despair, Alysse falls prey to a sleazy entrepreneur named Hector Lee who owns a club called Trance-Zen-Dance and who is also a drug dealer. Hector Lee has a young assistant called Trig who is a VJ, and is always getting new footage and talent.

Cast
Dan Spielman .... Tommy Matisse
Leeanna Walsman .... Alysse
Kerry Armstrong .... Carolyn
Abbie Cornish .... Emma
Rory Williamson .... Noah
Nathan Phillips .... Trig
Syd Brisbane .... Hamish
Frank Gallacher .... Malcolm
Alex Menglet .... May
Andrew Howard .... Hector Lee
Nathan Wentworth .... Stevie
Jay Smeaton  ......  Party Dancer 2

Crew
Paul Currie .... director & writer
Chip Richards... writer
David Hobson .... original music score composer
Paul van Dyk... additional music score

Soundtrack
The soundtrack was released on 15 February 2004 by Universal Music, and debuted at number forty-six on the Australian album charts in the week beginning 23 February 2004 and manage to reach to number twenty-two. The title track, sung by Lydia Denker, debuted at number thirty-five on the Australian single charts. There are two versions of the soundtrack:

One-disc version track listing
 "Blow Wind Blow" – Rairbirds 
 "Break It" (Down James Brown) – The Offcuts
 "Krazy Krush" – Ms. Dynamite
 "Crazy Beat" – Blur
 "What Is the Problem" – Graffiti
 "Don't Let the Man" – Fatboy Slim
 "Are You Ready for Love" (Radioslave mix) – Elton John
 "One Perfect Day" – Lydia Denker
 "No One Knows" – Queens of the Stone Age
 "Two Months Off" – Underworld
 "Late at Night" – Futureshock
 "All of Me" – Groove Armada
 "Schoolgirl" – Sandrine
 "Feathers and Down" – The Cardigans
 "Hector's Demise" – Dust Brothers
 "Ordinary World" (Josh G. Abrahams remix) – Mandy Kane
 "Pictures of You" (Old-z remix) – after The Cure's 1989 album Disintegration
 "One and the Same" (One Perfect Day Remix) – after Rob Dougan's 2002 album Furious Angels

Two-disc version track listing
Disc 1
 "Blow Wind Blow" – Rairbirds 
 "Break It" (Down James Brown) (Josh G. Abrahams Remix) – The Offcuts
 "Krazy Krush" – Ms. Dynamite
 "What Is the Problem?" – Graffiti
 "Don't Let the Man Get You Down" – Fatboy Slim
 "Are You Ready for Love" (radio slave remix) – Elton John
 "One Perfect Day" – Lydia Denker
 "Pictures of You" (Paul Mac remix) – after The Cure's 1989 album Disintegration
 "Two Months Off" – Underworld
 "Late at Night" – Futureshock
 "All of Me" – Groove Armada
 "Schoolgirl" – Old-z
 "Feathers and Down" – The Cardigans
 "Hector's Demise" – The Dust Brothers
 "No One Knows" (Unkle Remix) – Queens of the Stone Age
 "Ordinary World" (Josh Abrahams remix) – Mandy Kane
 "One and the Same" (One Perfect Day remix) – after Rob Dougan's 2002 album Furious Angels
 "Design Music" – Sven Väth

Disc 2
 "The Man with the Red Face" – Laurent Garnier
 "Horsepower" – C.J. Bolland
 "Graffiti Part Two" – Stereo MC's
 "No Transmission" – Lhb
 "To Know" – NuBreed
 "Gorecki" – Lamb
 "Just Show Me" – Grandadbob
 "Sleepwalking" – Euroboy
 "Sly-ed" – Man With No Name
 "Drop Some Drums" – Old-z
 "One Perfect Sunrise" – Orbital Featuring Lisa Gerrard
 "One Perfect Day" (epic dance mix) – Ali Mcgregor
 "Tv Screen Memories" – David Hobson and Lisa Gerrard
 "Final Moments" – David Hobson
 "One Perfect Day" (orchestral mix) – David Hobson & Orchestra
 Ride – Helmut

Box office
One Perfect Day grossed $1,152,011 at the box office in Australia.

See also
Cinema of Australia

References

External links
 
 
 
 

2004 films
Australian drama films
2004 drama films
Films shot in Melbourne
Films set in Melbourne
Films set in London
2000s English-language films